Omar Abdul Hamid Karami (last name also spelled Karamé and Karameh) (7 September 1934 – 1 January 2015) was the 29th prime minister of Lebanon, who served two separate terms. He was Prime Minister for the first time from 24 December 1990, when Selim al-Hoss gave up power, until May 1992, when he resigned due to economic instability. He was again Prime Minister from October 2004 to April 2005.

Early life
Karami was born Omar Abdul Hamid Karami in the northern Lebanese town of An Nouri, near Tripoli in 1934 to a Sunni Muslim family. He was the son of former prime minister and independence hero Abdul Hamid Karami. He was the brother of Arab nationalist the eight-time prime minister and major Lebanese statesman, Rashid Karami, who was assassinated in 1987. Omar Karami held a degree in law, which he received from Cairo University in 1956.

Career
Karami worked as both lawyer and businessman. In 1989, he was appointed education minister and on 24 December 1990, prime minister. He was in office until May 1992 when he resigned due to the collapse of the Lebanese pound against the US dollar which provoked street riots. Karami was elected as Parliamentary representative of Tripoli in 1991, following his brother's assassination. In late October 2004, he formed a cabinet after the resignation of Rafik Hariri.

Due to the assassination of ex-prime minister Hariri on 14 February 2005, members of the opposition blamed Syria for the assassination, and demanded Syria withdraw its troops and intelligence personnel from Lebanon. Protests grew in Beirut despite an official ban on public protests, and the opposition planned to call for a no confidence vote. Amid the growing pressure, Karami announced on 28 February 2005 that his government would resign, although it remained temporarily in a caretaker role.

Ten days after the resignation, following protests in Beirut that were supportive of president Karami, President Émile Lahoud re-appointed Karami as prime minister on 10 March and asked him to form a new government. With the backing of a majority of deputies, Karami called on all parties to join a government of national unity.

On 13 April, after failing to create a new government, Karami resigned again. He was replaced by Najib Mikati in the post. This resignation added to the turmoil already prevalent in Lebanon since Hariri's assassination as now there was no government to call the elections which were due that upcoming May. Karami did not run for office in the 2005 general elections.

Personal life

Karami was the father of Faisal Karami.

Death
On the morning of 1 January 2015, Karami died 
following a long period of illness at the age of 80.

References 

1934 births
2015 deaths
Cairo University alumni
People from Tripoli, Lebanon
Lebanese Sunni Muslims
Prime Ministers of Lebanon
Members of the Parliament of Lebanon
Children of national leaders
Arab Liberation Party politicians
20th-century Lebanese politicians
21st-century Lebanese politicians